Rakesh Roshan (born 6 September 1949) is an Indian film producer, director, screenwriter, and actor who works in Hindi films. He is the son of Indian music director Roshan and Indian Bengali singer Ira Roshan. He had appeared in 84 films throughout the 1970s and 1980s until 1989. As an actor, he was mostly known for his supporting roles in big-budget films starring Sanjeev Kumar and Rajesh Khanna in the lead role. Later, he achieved fame for directing films with titles beginning with the letter "K" since 1987. As a filmmaker, his most notable work includes the drama Khudgarz (1987), the revenge drama Khoon Bhari Maang (1988), the comedy-drama Kishen Kanhaiya (1990), the crime thriller Karan Arjun (1995), the romance Kaho Naa... Pyaar Hai (2000), the science fiction Koi... Mil Gaya (2003) and the superhero Krrish film series (20062013). Rakesh won the Filmfare Award for Best Director for directing the films; Kaho Naa... Pyaar Hai and Koi... Mil Gaya.

In January 2019, Rakesh was diagnosed with early-stage squamous cell carcinoma of the throat.'Career

1970-1990

After his father's (Roshan) untimely death, Rakesh started his career as an assistant director to film maker Mohan Kumar in films like Anjaana starring Rajendra Kumar and Babita.  Actor Rajendra Kumar referred him to some film makers and thus he was signed by Soodesh Kumar for Man Mandir starring Sanjeev Kumar and Waheeda Rehman. But he made his entry as an actor, making his debut in the 1970 film Ghar Ghar Ki Kahani, in which he got a supporting role. He got very few solo hero films in his career. He got solo hero roles in more women-oriented films where the focus was more on the heroine, such as Paraya Dhan with Hema Malini, Aankh Micholi with Bharati, Khubsoorat with Rekha and Kaamchor with Jaya Prada. His few successful solo hero films, with the focus equally on both hero and heroine, were Aankhon Aankhon Mein with Rakhee, Nafrat with Yogita Bali, Ek Kunwari Ek Kunwara with Leena Chandavarkar, Hamari Bahu Alka with Bindiya Goswami and Shubh Kaamna with Rati Agnihotri. J. Om Prakash produced Aankhon Aankhon Mein with Rakesh in the lead. Later, J. Om Prakash directed Aakraman, with Sanjeev Kumar in the lead, and had Rakesh in a supporting role, and then produced Aakhir Kyun?, with Rajesh Khanna in the lead and Rakesh in a supporting role. Rakesh played supporting roles in a few successful films such as Man Mandir with Sanjeev Kumar in the lead, Khel Khel Mein with Rishi Kapoor in the lead, Bullet with Dev Anand as the hero, Hatyara with Vinod Khanna in the lead, Dhongee with Randhir Kapoor, Khandaan with Jeetendra and Neeyat with Shashi Kapoor as the lead hero. He played supporting roles regularly in films with Rajesh Khanna in the lead role and of those, Chalta Purza was a failure and the other three were blockbusters - Dhanwan, Awaaz and Aakhir Kyon?. The few multi-star cast films he was part of as the lead hero that were successful between 1977 and 1986 were Devata, Shriman Shrimati and Haathkadi, all of which had Sanjeev Kumar as the main lead hero and Jaag Utha Insan and Ek Aur Sikander, which had Mithun Chakraborty in the main lead, and other hits such as Dil Aur Deewaar, Khatta Meetha, Unees-Bees (1980) and Maqaar (1986). Most of his other films as second lead hero or solo hero films between 1973 and 1990 were box office flops.

Rakesh set up his own production company, Filmkraft, in 1980 and their first production was Aap Ke Deewane (1980), which was a box office flop. His next venture was Kaamchor, also produced by him, which became a hit, but the success of this film was attributed to its music and the heroine Jaya Prada. His next solo hero film Shubh Kaamna, directed by K. Vishwanath, was a hit. He tried to re-launch himself as a lead hero with Bhagwaan Dada (1986), directed by J. Om Prakash and starring Rajinikanth as the main lead and himself in the second lead. But Bhagwaan Dada was a flop. Between 1984 and 1990 he only got supporting roles, with the exception of Bahurani. The multi-star films where he was the second lead, such as Maqaar and Ek Aur Sikander were successful. His last film as a leading hero was Bahurani, which was a woman-oriented film starring Rekha in the lead, which was directed by Manik Chatterjee and released in 1989.

1990–present
 
He made his directorial debut with Khudgarz (1987), and went on to direct box office hits such as Khoon Bhari Maang  (1988), Kishen Kanhaiya (1990),  Karan Arjun (1995), and the Shahrukh Khan starrer Koyla (1997). However, his other directorial ventures flopped. During this time, from 1990 to 1999 he only acted occasionally in films, making guest appearances, and focused mostly on directing. He launched his son Hrithik's career as an actor with Kaho Naa... Pyaar Hai (2000). Rakesh later revealed that this film was inspired by the storyline of Aradhana, starring Rajesh Khanna. This film, the highest grosser of 2000, entered the Limca Book of Records for the most awards won by a Bollywood film. He directed his son again in the 2003 science fiction film Koi... Mil Gaya, (fetching him the Filmfare award 2004 for best director), and its sequel, the science fiction superhero film Krrish (2006), both of which were also very successful at the box office. In 2008, he produced the film Krazzy 4. In 2010, he released a Bollywood meets Hollywood crossover film titled Kites. Another version of this film was released internationally and known as Brett Ratner presents Kites: The Remix. This version was shorter, and mainly toned down the amount of musical numbers. His latest film as producer was Kaabil, which released on 25 Jan 2017. The film stars Hrithik Roshan and Yami Gautam, and it grossed over Rs. 100 Crores at the box office.

2000 assassination attempt
On 21 January 2000, Roshan was shot at by two Budesh gang members near his office on Tilak Road at Santacruz West. The assailants fired two bullets at him, one of which hit him on the left arm, while the other grazed his chest. As the director fell to the ground, the assailants fled the scene. The assailants were later identified as Sunil Vithal Gaikwad and Sachin Kamble. The attack on Rakesh was not undertaken with the intent to kill, but to signal that the Shiv Sena could no longer protect its clients. Rakesh had stonewalled demands from Budesh for a percentage of the profits from the overseas sale of the Hindi all-time blockbuster; Kaho Naa... Pyaar Hai''.

Honors
 Rakesh was honoured on 3 December 2006 during the International Film Festival of India (IFFI) in Panaji for his contribution to mainstream cinema.
 On 11 December 2006, Rakesh was honoured during the Global Indian Film Awards (GIFA) for his outstanding contribution to Indian cinema over the past 35 years.

Filmography

Frequent collaborations
As a director, Rakesh is known for making films with his son Hrithik Roshan and having music directed by his brother Rajesh Roshan. Other actors he has frequently collaborated with include Rekha, Madhuri Dixit, Anil Kapoor, Shah Rukh Khan, and Amrish Puri. As a director, all his film name’s start with a 'K'.

Awards

References

External links

 
 LUX Magazine: Bollywood Bubbling

Male actors in Hindi cinema
Indian male voice actors
Film directors from Mumbai
Hindi-language film directors
Living people
20th-century Indian male actors
21st-century Indian male actors
Male actors from Mumbai
Sainik School alumni
1949 births
Film producers from Mumbai
20th-century Indian film directors
21st-century Indian film directors
Producers who won the Best Film on Other Social Issues National Film Award
Directors who won the Best Film on Other Social Issues National Film Award
Screen Awards winners
Zee Cine Awards winners
International Indian Film Academy Awards winners